The Obedient Wives Club (OWC) is an international Islamic faith-based organization which claims to promote harmonious families by teaching wives how to be submissive to their husbands. Composed of up to 3000 members, this group currently operates in Malaysia, Indonesia, Singapore, Australia, Kazakhstan, and Jordan, though it has plans to open chapters in England and France in 2013. In October 2011, the Obedient Wives Club published a highly controversial book called Islamic Sex, which encouraged wives to act like "first class whores" in order to keep husbands from straying. This book is currently banned in Indonesia and Malaysia. Despite the book only being available to its club, some of its content has been made known, sparking fierce debates online.

History
On June 3, 2011, a business firm called Global Ikhwan established the first chapter of the Obedient Wives Club in Kuala Lumpur, Malaysia. Originally intended to help the female staff become good wives and productive employees, the group's main goal was to revolutionize the way Muslim wives viewed sex within marriage.

Global Ikhwan, which also founded a controversial polygamy club, has been closely tied to the religious Islamic sect Al-Arqam which was banned in Malaysia in 1994. The Obedient Wives Club denies allegations that they are trying to revive Al-Arqam.

Though the Obedient Wives Club is an Islamic organization, they are open to any woman, regardless of their denomination. The Obedient Wives Club claims to fight divorce, domestic violence, and other social ills by teaching wives how to please their husbands. As one member put it, "A man married to a woman who is as good or better than a prostitute in bed has no reason to stray. Rather than allowing him to sin, a woman must do all she can to ensure his desires are met."

Controversy
In October 2011, the Obedient Wives Club published a 115-page book, guiding wives through the physical and spiritual aspects of sex. This book, titled Islamic Sex, quickly stirred controversy. Many groups, such as Sisters in Islam, Aware (the Association of Women for Action and Research) and the Islamic Religious Council of Singapore, criticized the book, calling it backwards and disrespectful to women and men. In particular, they disputed the club's assertion that if wives serve their husbands like "first class prostitutes" they will be able to maintain happy marriages. Critics argue that the values being promoted by the club involve objectification of women, and places unfair responsibility on wives. They further argue it reduces Islamic marriage to a sexual exchange. As a representative of the Islamic Religious Council of Singapore said, "Happiness in a marriage goes beyond receiving sexual fulfillment from one's wife." Minister Shahrizat Jalil of the Women, Family and Community Development agreed, noting "To hinge fidelity, domestic violence and the fulfillment of a husband’s responsibilities purely on a wife's capacity to be obedient, stimulate sexual arousal … is not only demeaning to wives, but to husbands as well."

In conjunction with the launch of the book, a stage performance glorifying Islamic sex took place. In the performance, the performers claim that Islamic sex is "many times more amazing than the forbidden sex of the Jews" also raised eyebrows.

Other groups have criticized the book for promoting group sex between a man and his wives. However, the Obedient Wives Club claims that this is a purely spiritual exercise and not a physical reality.

In November 2011, the Malaysian government banned the book.

Islamic basis
The Obedient Wives Club claims that Islam promotes sex within marriage, noting that "You [God] have said that all these acts are halal, pure, beautiful and like a prayer [between a man and a wife]."

Future plans
The Club's parent organization moved its headquarters to Mecca, Saudi Arabia. They hope to keep expanding throughout South East Asia.

See also
Ashaari Mohammad
Duty
Gender inequality
Islam in Malaysia
Polygamy in Islam

References 

Islam in Malaysia
Patriarchy
Polygyny
Organizations established in 2011
Complementarianism
Women's rights in Islam
Women in Kuala Lumpur